Bacteroides ureolyticus is a species in the bacterial genus of Gram-negative, obligately anaerobic bacteria. Bacteroides species are non-endospore-forming bacilli, and may be either motile or non-motile, depending on the species. The DNA base composition is 40–48% GC. Unusual in bacterial organisms, Bacteroides membranes contain sphingolipids. They also contain meso-diaminopimelic acid in their peptidoglycan layer.

Bacteroides are normally mutualistic, a substantial portion of the mammalian gastrointestinal flora, and they process complex molecules into simpler ones. As many as 1010-1011 cells per gram of human feces have been reported. They can use simple sugars when available; however, the main sources of energy for Bacteroides species in the gut are complex host-derived and plant glycans.

Pathophysiology
Bacteroides ureolyticus has been isolated from pregnant women with symptoms of bacterial vaginosis.

Other species
 B. acidifaciens
 B. distasonis (reclassified as Parabacteroides distasonis)
 B. gracilis
 B. fragilis
 B. oris
 B. ovatus
 B. putredinis
 B. pyogenes
 B. stercoris
 B. suis
 B. tectus
 B. thetaiotaomicron
 B. thetaitamicron
 B. vulgatus

See also
 CrAssphage
 Cytophaga
 Flavobacterium

References

External links
 Bacteroides infections in E Medicine

Bacterial diseases
Bacterial vaginosis
Bacteroidia
Gram-negative bacteria
Gut flora bacteria
Medically important anaerobes
Sexually transmitted diseases and infections
Bacteria described in 1978